Haruru is a residential and commercial locality in the Far North District of New Zealand. State Highway 11 runs through the locality. Puketona is 10 kilometres west, and Paihia is 4 kilometres east, The name means a continuous noise or roar in the Māori language, which refers to the sound of Haruru Falls, a five metre high broad waterfall about a kilometre away.

History
The pool at the base of the falls was an early river port for Northland, with the Waitangi River providing access to the Bay of Islands. A hotel was built at Haruru in 1828, and a store was added to it about 1858. The hotel burned down in 1937. It may have been the first licensed hotel in New Zealand.

Demographics

Haruru had a population of 1,077 at the 2018 New Zealand census, an increase of 210 people (24.2%) since the 2013 census, and an increase of 291 people (37.0%) since the 2006 census. There were 393 households, comprising 528 males and 546 females, giving a sex ratio of 0.97 males per female. The median age was 45.0 years (compared with 37.4 years nationally), with 213 people (19.8%) aged under 15 years, 129 (12.0%) aged 15 to 29, 489 (45.4%) aged 30 to 64, and 243 (22.6%) aged 65 or older.

Ethnicities were 79.1% European/Pākehā, 25.9% Māori, 4.5% Pacific peoples, 3.9% Asian, and 2.5% other ethnicities. People may identify with more than one ethnicity.

The percentage of people born overseas was 25.9, compared with 27.1% nationally.

Although some people chose not to answer the census's question about religious affiliation, 51.5% had no religion, 37.0% were Christian, 3.3% had Māori religious beliefs, 0.6% were Hindu, 0.3% were Muslim, 0.6% were Buddhist and 1.4% had other religions.

Of those at least 15 years old, 132 (15.3%) people had a bachelor's or higher degree, and 150 (17.4%) people had no formal qualifications. The median income was $25,000, compared with $31,800 nationally. 78 people (9.0%) earned over $70,000 compared to 17.2% nationally. The employment status of those at least 15 was that 378 (43.8%) people were employed full-time, 126 (14.6%) were part-time, and 30 (3.5%) were unemployed.

References

Far North District
Populated places in the Northland Region